Epiphone is an American musical instrument brand that traces its roots to a musical instrument manufacturing business founded in 1873 by Anastasios Stathopoulos in Smyrna, Ottoman Empire, and moved to New York City in 1908. After taking over his father's business, Epaminondas Stathopoulos named the company "Epiphone" as a combination of his own nickname "Epi" and the suffix "-phone" (from Greek phon-, "voice") in 1928, the same year it began making guitars.

In 1957 Epiphone, Inc. was purchased by Gibson, its main rival in the archtop guitar market at the time. Gibson relocated Epiphone's manufacturing operation from its original Queens, New York, factory to Gibson's Kalamazoo, Michigan, factory. Over time, as Gibson moved its own manufacturing operations to other facilities, Epiphone followed suit; Gibson has also subcontracted the construction of Epiphone products to various facilities in the US and internationally. Today, Epiphone is still used as a brand for the Gibson company, both for budget models of other Gibson-branded products and for several Epiphone-exclusive models.  Aside from guitars, Epiphone has also made double basses, banjos, and other string instruments, as well as amplifiers.

History 
Epiphone began in 1873, in Smyrna, Ottoman Empire (now İzmir, Turkey), where Greek founder Anastasios Stathopoulos made his own fiddles and lutes (oud, laouto). Stathopoulos moved to the United States in 1903 and continued to make his original instruments, as well as mandolins, from a factory at 35-37 36th Street in Long Island City, Queens, New York. Anastasios died in 1915, and his son, Epaminondas ("Epi"), took over. 

After two years, the company became known as "The House of Stathopoulo". Just after the end of World War I, the company started to make banjos. The company produced its recording line of banjos in 1924 and, four years later, took on the name of the "Epiphone Banjo Company". It produced its first guitars in 1928. After Epi died in 1943, control of the company went to his brothers, Orphie and Frixo. In 1951, a four-month-long strike precipitated a relocation of Epiphone from New York City to Philadelphia.

In 1957 the company was acquired by Gibson. Since then, the brand has been used for a number of different guitars, some manufactured by Gibson itself in its own factories, and some manufactured by other companies such as Matsumoku under contract to Gibson and marketed under the Epiphone brand.

Products 
Historically, Epiphone branded guitars have fallen broadly into three categories. Firstly, Epiphone is used as a "budget brand" for Gibson, producing identically-named but lower-priced versions of popular Gibson models, such as the Epiphone Les Paul, which serves as a budget model comparable to the Gibson Les Paul.  Secondly, Epiphone has also been used to brand models under alternate names, but are otherwise similar to more expensive Gibson-branded guitars, for example the Epiphone G-400 is functionally equivalent to the Gibson SG, and the Epiphone Dot is essentially a budget version of the Gibson ES-335.  Occasionally, the Epiphone version of the guitar is historically better known, for example the Epiphone Casino, functionally identical to the Gibson ES-330, is better known due to its close association with artists such as The Beatles.  Thirdly are models which are exclusive to the Epiphone brand without equivalent models produced under the Gibson brand, such as the Epiphone Coronet.

As of January 2021, Epiphone was marketing guitars under several lines, including several categorized on their website as "inspired by Gibson" for models that serve as the budget Gibson version.  Historically, hundreds of different models have borne the Epiphone brand, and many are available in the used guitar market.

Gibson-equivalent electric guitars

Les Paul
ES Series
ES-125TDC
ES-335
ES-339
SG
Flying V
Firebird
Explorer
Thunderbird bass

Epiphone-exclusive electric guitars
Archtop, hollow body and semi-hollow body guitars
Sheraton
Casino
Riviera
Wildkat
Emperor
Solid body
Coronet
Wilshire
Crestwood
Bass guitars
Jack Casady bass
Viola bass (modeled after the Höfner 500/1)
Allen Woody Rumblekat bass
Embassy bass
AccuBass (A P-Bass configuration)
RockBass (A Jazz Bass configuration)
PowerBass (A P/J configuration)

Gibson-equivalent acoustic guitars
Hummingbird 6- and 12-string models
Dove
J-200
Gibson J-45 in full and single-cutaway models

Epiphone-exclusive acoustic guitars
Texan
Classical E1
Songmaker
Pro-1
Masterbilt Series
L'il Tex (travel-sized Texan)
El Nino (travel-sized)
Excellente (rare, only 139 ever made from 1963 until 1970, reissued in 2021 as part of the "Masterbilt" series)
Frontier (made from 1958-1970, reissued briefly in the 1990s, and reissued again in 2020 as part of the "Masterbilt" series and in 2021 as part of the "Made in USA" collection)

Gallery of historic Epiphone models

Amplifiers 

Epiphone began producing amplifiers in 1935 with the Electar Hawaiian Lap Steel Guitar Outfit. This outfit was an amplifier, case and lap steel guitar stand all rolled into one unit and was supplied by a suitcase manufacturer of the time. Electar Century and Zephyr amplifier models followed.

Gibson produced Epiphone amplifiers in the 1960s. These were copies or variations of Gibson and Fender amplifiers. They used a tube design, and some had reverb and tremolo. Gibson decided to launch a new line of Epiphone tube amplifiers in 2005 with models including the So Cal, Blues Custom, Epiphone Valve Junior and the solid state Triggerman range. The Valve Hot Rod and Valve Senior followed in 2009.  The Valve Hot Rod is a 5 watt amp like the Valve Junior, but has a gain and reverb control.  The Valve Senior offers 20 watts of power, with a full equalizer, gain, volume, reverb, and presence control.

As of 2012, Epiphone has ceased production of their line of amplifiers with the exception of the Player and Performance Pack practice amplifiers, available only in Epiphone's starter packages. These Amplifiers were under the Epiphone Electar brand. In 2014 the   1939 Electar Century 18-watt valve amplifier was reissued in an updated 75th anniversary Limited Edition.

Manufacturing

United States
Epiphone instruments made between 1957 and 1970 were at Gibson facilities on Parsons Street and Eleanor Street in Kalamazoo, Michigan. Solid body guitars with flat tops and backs were made at the Eleanor Street plants (both Gibson and Epiphone) in Kalamazoo, Michigan. Some of these Epiphone instruments were effectively identical to the relevant Gibson versions, perhaps made with same timber, materials and components as the contemporary equivalent Gibson guitars. Epiphone also continued its production of world class archtop guitars using the same patterns and molds from Epi's New York era.
 
Some specific examples of Gibson-era Epiphone instruments from this period includes the Epiphone Sheraton (co-developed with the Gibson ES-335 & sharing its semi-hollow body, but with, Epiphone's pre-Gibson "Frequensator" tailpiece and "New York" mini-humbucker pickups, and significantly fancier inlays) and Sheraton II (replacing the Frequensator with Gibson's "stop-bar" tailpiece), the Epiphone Casino (similar to the Gibson ES-330), the Epiphone Caballero (similar to the Gibson LG-0), the Epiphone Cortez (similar to the Gibson LG-2), the Epiphone Frontier (similar to the Gibson Hummingbird), the Epiphone Olympic Special (similar to the Gibson Melody Maker), the Epiphone Sorrento (similar to the Gibson ES-125TC, except for a few cosmetic changes), and the Epiphone Texan (similar to the Gibson J-45, apart from a change in scale-length). The other Kalamazoo-made Epiphones had technical or cosmetic relationship with the similar Gibson version.

Several Epiphone guitars have been produced in the United States after 1971. The Epiphone Spirit and Special were produced in the early 1980s in Kalamazoo. In 1993, three historic Epiphone acoustic guitars, the Texan, Frontier, and Excellente, were produced by Gibson Acoustic in Montana. The Paul McCartney Texan was produced in 2005, and in 2009, the Epiphone Historic Collection was created, beginning with the 1962 Wilshire, built by Gibson Custom. Several other models, such as the Sheraton and John Lennon Casinos, were built in Japan and assembled and finished by Gibson USA.

Japan
In the early 1970s, Matsumoku began to manufacture Epiphone instruments in Japan  with the production and distribution being managed by Aria, in cooperation with Gibson. At this time, Epiphone ceased production of all of its traditional designs and began manufacturing markedly less expensive guitars, many of which had less traditional bolt-on style necks and unspecified wood types. Some of these guitars had similar body shapes to traditional Epiphone and Gibson designs but had different names while other models retained certain model designations, such as the FT (Flat Top) guitars. Construction of these guitars differed greatly from past Epiphone models. For the first several years of production in Japan, Epiphone guitars were actually rebranded designs already produced by the Matsumoku Company.

By 1975, the Japanese market started seeing some of the more familiar designs and names being reintroduced. These guitars were of higher quality than that of the previous years of production in Japan and included models such as the Wilshire, Emperor, Riviera and Newport bass. These models were available to the Japanese market only. By 1976 new designs of higher quality were being introduced for export but did not include the current Japanese market models. Notable new designs from this era were the Monticello (Scroll Guitar), the Presentation (PR) and Nova series flat tops and the Genesis solid body guitar. By 1980, most Japanese-only designs were available for worldwide distribution. One in particular, the ES930J, was made at the famed Terada factory and was a superior instrument. The Matsumoku-made archtops, such as the Emperor, Riviera, Sheraton and Casino, were available into the mid-1980s.

Korea
From the 1980s, Epiphones were manufactured mainly in South Korea and Japan by contractors licensed by Gibson. One of the contractors was Samick, which also built instruments under license for other brands, and in its own name. The brand was primarily used to issue less expensive versions of classic Gibson models.<

The guitars were constructed using different woods, generally only distantly related to true mahogany, and were fastened with epoxies rather than traditional wood glues. Gibson and Epiphone guitars all use Titebond resin glue, which is simple carpenters' wood glue, and were finished in hard, quick-to-apply polyester resin rather than the traditional nitro-cellulose lacquer used by Gibson Epiphone guitars assembled or made in the US use lacquer finishes unless it's a san lacquer (SL for short), but those made outside of the US use a polyurethane finish because of pollution requirements. Those particular budget considerations, along with others such as the use of plastic nuts, and cheaper hardware and pickups, make for a more affordable instrument.

After 1996, Epiphones were built by the Peerless Guitars Co. Ltd., established in 1970 in Busan, South Korea. Many of these Peerless guitars, particularly the 1998 models commenting their 125th Anniversary, were very well made, represent excellent value, and have become quite collectable. However, all the guitars made at the Peerless plant, including the vastly underrated Sorrento model, are very well made and are well worth a search.

There is a controversial Epiphone guitar using "LU" serial number. It is said those guitars were made in Indonesia under license from Unsung Korea.

China
Between the Peerless period and the opening of the Qingdao plant, many Epiphones were constructed at the Zaozhuang Saehan plant in China. Guitars from his period are considered to be of high quality and, because of the relative rareness and quality factors, are sought after by Epiphone fans and collectors. 

In 2004, Gibson opened a factory in Qingdao, China, which manufactures Epiphone guitars. With few exceptions, Epiphones are now built only in the Qingdao factory.

Also in 2004, Epiphone introduced a series of acoustic guitars named Masterbilt, after a line of guitars of the 1930s, which are built in the same factory.

Imperial Series and Elitist
During the early 1990s, Epiphone released a series called the Imperial Series. These were remakes of the classic Epiphone archtops of the 1930s and '40s. Each instrument was handmade in the FujiGen factory in Japan. This short-lived series was discontinued in 1993, after only 42 Emperors were made. Several other models, including De Luxe, Broadway and Triumph models, were also produced in varying quantities.

Production was moved back to Nashville and Bozeman for a similar limited run of instruments (250 each of Sheratons, Rivieras, Frontiers, Excellentes and Texans). These guitars were the "Nashville USA Collection" (archtops) and the "Anniversary Series" (acoustics). Contrary to popular information, this line was related to, but not part of the 1994 Gibson Centennial Series commemorating 100 years of the Gibson Guitar Corporation. The Nashville and Anniversary Collections were intended as reintroductions of original, USA built Epiphone models.

In 2002, Epiphone began producing a range of higher quality instruments under the "Elite Series" moniker which were built by Terada and FujiGen in Japan. After legal action by Ovation the name was changed to Elitist in 2003. As of 2008, all of the Elitist models have been discontinued with the exception of the Elitist Casino and the Dwight Trash Casino. The Epiphone Elitist guitars included features such as higher grade woods, bone nuts, hand-rubbed finishes, "Made in the USA" pickups and USA strings. Japanese domestic market Elitists used the Gibson Dove-wing headstock as opposed to the "tombstone" headstock used on exports.

Serial numbers and factory codes

Current Epiphone serial numbers give the following information:

Korea

I = Saein
U = Unsung
S = Samick
P or R = Peerless
K = Korea
F = Fine
C = Korea

China
MR = CHINA
DW = DaeWon
EA = Gibson/QingDao
EE = Gibson/QingDao
MC = Muse
SJ = SaeJung
Z = Zaozhuang Saehan
BW = China

Japan

No letter or F = FujiGen
J or T = Terada

Czech Republic

B = Bohêmia Musico-Delicia

Indonesia
CI = cort indonesia
SI = Samick Indonesia

Example: SI09034853 SI = Samick Indonesia, 09 = 2009, 03 = March, 4853 = manufacturing number.

YYMMFF12345

YY year
MM month
FF factory-code
12345 production#
FACTORY NUMBER CODES—for some models starting in 2008, if serial # begins w/numbers
[NOTE: The factories identified by these codes are based on patterns that forum members have observed. The numbers appear as the 5th and sixth digits in the serial number.]
11 = MIC sticker on a '08 Masterbilt
12 = DeaWon or Unsung (China—uncertainty remains as to which factory)
13 = Sticker: Made in China (Unknown factory; Epiphone LP-100)
15 = Qingdao (China) – electric
16 = Qingdao (China) – acoustic
17 = China – factory unknown MIC sticker on a J160E
18 = China – factory unknown found on one 2009 model bass
20 = DaeWon or Unsung (China—uncertainty remains as to which factory)
21 = Unsung, Korea
22 = ??? Korea (factory still unknown)
23 = ??? Indonesia (factory still unknown, probably Samick,)
I = Indonesia (this letter has appeared as the 5th digit on two authentic new models made in Indonesia

Players of Epiphone

John Lennon - The Beatles

Paul McCartney - The Beatles

Noel Gallagher - Oasis

Matthew Followill - Kings of Leon

References

External links

 
 Epiphone Serial Numbers on Guitar Dater Project
 Epiphone Guitars Database on ReverbZone

Companies established in 1873
Gibson Brands
Musical instruments brands
Musical instrument manufacturing companies of the United States
Mandolin makers
Companies that filed for Chapter 11 bankruptcy in 2018